Tyagraj Khadilkar is an Indian singer, music composer, actor and host in Marathi film industry. He was the contestant of Boss Marathi 1 and was Evicted on Day 56.

Childhood

Tyagraj Khadilkar is from the musical family of Krushnaji Prabhakar Khadilkar in Kolhapur. He completed his initial schooling in Kolhapur and then moved to Pune. He completed his schooling at Modern High School, Pune and graduated from PES Modern College of Engineering Pune. He received music education from his mother Manjushri Khadilkar and Indirabai Khadilkar and Gangadhar buva Pimpalkhare.

Career
Tyagraj has sung more than 52 title tracks of Marathi TV shows. He has worked with few music composers like Datta Davjekar, Anil Mohile, Shridhar Phadke, Ram-Lakshman, Ashok Patki and Avadhoot Gupte. He has given a play back to more than 35 Marathi movies.

He has also worked as a TV host of programs including Aarahi, Geetakshri, Naman Natawara, Tikal Te Political and Sher-E-Nagma.

He has sung more 60 title songs of TV serials including Hamm Panch, Tutaki Bajake and Tikal Te Political.

Play back singer and Composer
 Shodh 2003
 Limited Manusaki 1995
 Shivarayachi Soon Taratani 1993
 Thaiman 2007
 Chalu Navra Bholi Bayko
 Kay Dyacha Bola
Jau Tethe Khau 2007

Television
 Bigg Boss Marathi 1 as Contestant (evicted on day 56)

Awards
 Manik Verma award by Sur Singer Sansad and All India Natya Parishad
 Voice Choice award for Sa Re ga Ma Hindi on Zee TV Hindi

Personal life
Tyagraj is married to Veena Khadilkar. They have a daughter and a son. His sister Amruta is also a singer. She had participated in Sa re ga ma musical program on Zee TV.

References

Living people
Indian male singers
Marathi-language singers
1967 births
Bigg Boss Marathi contestants